Kindersley is a town surrounded by the Rural Municipality of Kindersley No. 290 in west-central Saskatchewan, Canada. It is located along Highway 7, a primary highway linking Calgary, Alberta and Saskatoon, Saskatchewan. At a population of 4,597 in 2016, it is an established industrial base for the resource-rich west-central region of the province and a service centre to the oil and gas industry and agriculture production.

History 
Kindersley was incorporated in 1910, and named after Sir Robert Kindersley, Governor of the Hudson's Bay Company (1915-25) and a major shareholder in the Canadian Northern Railway, which was nationalized and amalgamated into Canadian National Railways in 1918. Canadian Northern had made Kindersley a divisional point on its line between Saskatoon and Calgary. In 2016, having sustained a population of more than 5,000 for several years (meeting the provincial criteria), the town of Kindersley applied to the province of Saskatchewan for city status. Although official census information from 2011 indicated an official population below 5,000, the town disputed the accuracy of those numbers. As of 2022, city status has yet to be granted, and as noted below the official federal census for 2021 shows its population still below the 5,000 threshold.

Kindersley Regional Park 
Kindersley Regional Park, founded in 1968, is located on the south side of Kindersley at Motherwell Reservoir. Amenities at the park include a campground, golf course, hiking trails, ball diamonds, fishing, and a picnic area. Non-motorised boats are permitted on the reservoir. The campground has 45 campsites with 30 amp service and 6 sites with 15 amps for tenting. The golf course is a 9-hole, grass greens course. It is a par 36 with a total of 3,127 yards.

Demographics 

Climate

Kindersley experiences a semi-arid climate (Köppen climate classification BSk). Winters are long, cold and dry, while summers are short and warm. Precipitation is low, with an annual average of 325 mm, and is heavily concentrated in the warmer months.

The record one-day rainfall is 77.2 mm (3 inches) on July 6, 1991.  The record one-day snowfall is 21 cm (8.3 inches) on December 27, 1990.

Economy 

The Bakken shale oil and gas play, driven by hydraulic fracturing technologies, has contributed to Kindersley's economy since 2009. Kindersley sells its treated municipal wastewater to a local oilfield service company to use in hydraulic fracturing.

Events

Annual events in Kindersley include the Indoor Rodeo and Trade Show in June and the four-day Goose Festival in September, among numerous sports and cultural activities throughout the rest of the year. Kindersley was chosen as the launch site for the da Vinci Project, Canada's entry to win the Ansari X Prize. The flight was scheduled for October 2004, but circumstances related to the project prevented the flight from taking place. Kindersley celebrated its 100th birthday in 2010.

Education

Kindersley has three schools, all operating within the Sun West School Division. Westberry is an elementary school, Elizabeth is a middle school and the Kindersley Composite School is 9-12. There is also a regional college at the Great Plains Regional College location.

Sports
Kindersley is home to a full-service 9-hole golf course; two world class, fully irrigated baseball diamonds; a .3 mile, tri-oval speedway and the West Central Events Center (WCEC), with two ice surfaces and a curling rink.  The WCEC is home to the local SJHL Klippers hockey team. Part of the WCEC, an older arena called Exhibition Stadium, was destroyed by fire on January 8, 2010.

Kindersley has also hosted many sporting events including the 1984 World Youth Baseball Championships, 1990 Men's Provincial Curling Championship, 1994 Saskatchewan Winter Games, 1997 Canadian Mixed Curling Championships, 2001 Men's Provincial Curling Championships, 2007 Provincial Mixed Curling Championships, 2008 Junior Men's and Women's Provincial Curling Championships, 2009 and 2010 Baseball Canada Cup and the 2010 Provincial Scotties Tournament of Hearts (the tournament was moved to Eston because of the fire on January 8, 2010). The arena also hosted Team Canada's World Juniors for the 1991 World Junior Championships in Saskatoon. They used the rink as a practice facility and it was also the venue for a game between Czechoslovakia and Switzerland. The most recent event was the 2014 World Jr. A Challenge put on by Hockey Canada that displayed the best Jr. A players from around the world. Teams from Canada, USA, Russia, Switzerland and Denmark participated

Media

Local media includes The Kindersley Clarion, a weekly newspaper owned by Jamac Publishing Ltd., and two radio stations owned by Golden West Broadcasting: CKVX 104.9 FM and CFYM 1210 AM.

Notable people 
Bob Bourne — ice hockey
Derek Dorsett — ice hockey
John-James Ford — writer
Curtis Glencross — ice hockey
Glenda Goertzen — author
Gordon Hahn (1919–2001) — California politician, born in Kindersley
Dave Lewis — National Hockey League coach
Greg Paslawski — ice hockey

References

Notes

External links 

 
Kindersley No. 290, Saskatchewan
Towns in Saskatchewan
Division No. 13, Saskatchewan